Comitas pachycercus is a species of sea snails, a marine gastropod mollusc in the family Pseudomelatomidae

Distribution
This marine species occurs off New Caledonia.

References

 Sysoev, A.; Bouchet, P. (2001). Gastéropodes turriformes (Gastropoda: Conoidea) nouveaux ou peu connus du Sud-Ouest Pacifique = New and uncommon turriform gastropods (Gastropoda: Conoidea) from the South-West Pacific. in: Bouchet, P. et al. (Ed.) Tropical deep-sea benthos. Mémoires du Muséum national d'Histoire naturelle. Série A, Zoologie. 185: 271-320
 Bouchet, Philippe, et al. "A quarter-century of deep-sea malacological exploration in the South and West Pacific: where do we stand? How far to go." Tropical deep-sea Benthos 25 (2008): 9-40

External links
 Holotype in MNHN, Paris
 
 
 Bioliob.cz: Comitas pachycercus

pachycercus
Gastropods described in 2001